China–Colombia relations refers to the diplomatic relations between the People's Republic of China and the Republic of Colombia. Diplomatic relation were established in 1980. Both nations are members of the Group of 77 and the United Nations.

History
Early contacts between China and Colombia date to the early days of the Spanish Colonial Empire in the Americas and the Philippines. In the 16th-17th century, people, goods, and news traveling between China and Spain usually did so through the Philippines (where there was a large Chinese settlement) and (via the Manila galleon trade) to Mexico. From there, many goods and services were continued onwards to Lima, Peru and would make stop-overs in Colombia.

After World War II, Colombia established diplomatic relations with the Republic of China (Taiwan) in 1949. During the Korean War, both Colombia and the People's Republic of China (PRC) fought on opposite sides in the conflict. In September 1977, a group of Colombians of all political and ideological tendencies and of all social origins; organized themselves into the Colombia-China Friendship Association, which began to act under the premises established by their Chinese counterpart and which sought to support the cause of the establishment of relations between the PRC and Colombia based on the One-China policy, and to expand the space of cultural and historical recognition regardless of political or ideological affiliation.

On 7 February 1980, Colombia established diplomatic relations with the PRC and broke diplomatic relations with Taiwan per the One-China policy. Since the establishment of diplomatic relations, high-level meetings have been held and a friendly relationship has been strengthened in various areas such as multilateral, technical, educational, cultural, military, economic and commercial cooperation, among others.

In 1985, Chinese Premier Zhao Ziyang paid a visit to Colombia, becoming the first Chinese head-of-government to visit the nation. During his visit, Premier Zhao met with Colombian President Belisario Betancur. In 1996, Colombian President Ernesto Samper Pizano paid a visit to China, becoming the first Colombian President to visit China. From the initial visits, there would be several high-level visits between leaders of both nations.

China is Colombia's second largest trading partner globally (after the United States). In 2020, both nations celebrated 40 years of diplomatic relations.

High-level Visits
High-level visits from China to Colombia
 Premier Zhao Ziyang (1985)
 Vice-president Xi Jinping (2009)

High-level visits from Colombia to China
 President Ernesto Samper Pizano (1996)
 President Andrés Pastrana Arango (1999)
 President Álvaro Uribe (2005)
 Vice-president Francisco Santos Calderón (2006)
 President Juan Manuel Santos (2012)
 President Iván Duque Márquez (2019)

Bilateral agreements
Both nations have signed several bilateral agreements such as a Trade Agreement (1981); Agreement on Scientific and Technical Cooperation (1981); Agreement on the project Plan for Prevention and Protection against Forest Fires in Colombia (1997); Memorandum of Understanding of Cooperation in the Fight Against Illicit Trafficking of Narcotics and Psychotropic Substances and Related Crimes (1998); Treaty on Judicial Assistance in Criminal Matters (1999); Agreement on Economic and Technical Cooperation (2007); Agreement for the Promotion and Protection of Investments (2008); Agreement on the Prevention of Theft, Clandestine Excavation and Illicit Import and Export of Cultural Goods (2012); and a Treaty on the Transfer of Sentenced Persons (2019).

Resident diplomatic missions
 China has an embassy in Bogotá.
 Colombia has an embassy in Beijing and consulates-general in Guangzhou, Hong Kong and Shanghai.

See also
 Immigration to Colombia

References 

Colombia
China